Hexabromobenzene is an aromatic compound.  It is a derivative of benzene in which all hydrogen atoms are replaced by bromine atoms.

Hexabromobenzene has seen use in high voltage capacitors as a flame retardant.  It also has applications as a starting material in the formation of thin graphene-like films for low cost energy storage devices and capacitors.

References

Bromoarenes